James Balfour (1854–1917) was a Canadian architect.

Son of Peter Balfour, Hamilton alderman and carpenter. Educated in Hamilton. Studied architecture with the famous firm of Peddie and Kniver in Edinburgh, Scotland. Before returning to Hamilton he worked in New York City for several years. First professional mention of Balfour in Hamilton is in the 1876-7 city directory. The house still standing at 250 James Street South was one of his early designs. His larger buildings were of the Romanesque style, revived around 1870 by Henry Hobson Richardson of the United States.

Tuckett Mansion, on corner of King & Queen, now forms a portion of the complex known as the Scottish Rite. Completed in 1896 for George Elias Tuckett, founder of Tuckett Tobacco and the 27th mayor of Hamilton, City Hall on corner of James & York Boulevard (1888, demolished), both in Hamilton, Ontario.

Balfour was also successful outside of Hamilton. In 1878-1882 designed and oversaw construction of an all-girl school, Alma College (St. Thomas, Ontario) (1878–81) and the additions (1888–89), which were destroyed by a fire on May 28, 2008.

In March 1887 he won the design competition for the Detroit Museum of Art.  His entry was entitled "Wisdom, Strength, and Beauty", a Romanesque style structure that was dedicated September 1, 1888..

References

 MapArt Golden Horseshoe Atlas - Page 657 - Grids A12

2. Jean Rosenfeld. James Balfour a Victorian architect from Hamilton, Canada. Thesis(M.A.)--York University, 1991. 
,  

3.  Heritage Matters. Ontario Heritage Foundation. Volume 6 Issue 3 2008

1854 births
1917 deaths
Artists from Hamilton, Ontario
Canadian architects
Canadian people of Scottish descent
People associated with the Detroit Institute of Arts
Members of the Royal Canadian Academy of Arts